Raising a Husband was an Australian television game show which aired in 1957 to 1958. Information on this series is extremely scarce. Based on a 3XY radio show, it was hosted by Alwyn Kurts, aired on station GTV-9 in Melbourne, and was produced by Crawford Productions. Crawford also produced several other 1950s Australian television series, including the game show Wedding Day, comedy series Take That, and children's series Peters Club.

Game play
Three married couples were asked a series of questions on domestic problems to determine which was "the most human husband"

Episode status
Is it not known how many episodes exist as Kinescope recordings. An episode from 27 June 1957 is held by National Film and Sound Archive, along with an additional episode from an unknown date.

See also
The Pressure Pak Show
The Dulux Show
Give it a Go

References

External links
 

Nine Network original programming
1957 Australian television series debuts
1958 Australian television series endings
Black-and-white Australian television shows
English-language television shows
1950s Australian game shows
Australian live television series
Television series based on radio series
Television series by Crawford Productions